James Ridley (born 1889; date of death unknown) was an English professional footballer who played in the Football League for Newcastle United and Nottingham Forest as an outside left.

Personal life 
Ridley served as a corporal in the Royal Engineers during the First World War.

Career statistics

References 

English Football League players
Place of death missing
Newcastle United F.C. players
English footballers
1889 births
Year of death missing
Footballers from Newcastle upon Tyne
Association football outside forwards
British Army personnel of World War I
Royal Engineers soldiers
Willington Athletic F.C. players
Nottingham Forest F.C. players
Ashington A.F.C. players
Hartlepool United F.C. players